Penn State Law, located in University Park, Pennsylvania, is one of two separately accredited law schools of the Pennsylvania State University. Penn State Law offers J.D., LL.M., and S.J.D. degrees. The school also offers a joint J.D./M.B.A. with the Smeal College of Business, a joint J.D./M.I.A. degree with the School of International Affairs, which is also located in the Lewis Katz Building, as well as joint degrees with other graduate programs at Penn State.

Penn State Law traces its roots to the founding of The Dickinson School of Law in Carlisle, Pennsylvania. Penn State and The Dickinson School of Law merged in 2000, and, until fall 2014, Penn State's Dickinson School of Law operated as a single law school with two campuses—one in Carlisle and one on Penn State's University Park campus in State College, Pennsylvania. The first class to attend the University Park campus was during the 2006-2007 academic year. In the summer of 2014, Penn State received approval from the American Bar Association to operate the two campuses as two separate and distinct law schools, both of which share the history of The Dickinson School of Law: Dickinson Law, in Carlisle, Pennsylvania, and Penn State Law, in University Park, Pennsylvania. In November 2022, Penn State President Neeli Bendapudi announced a task force to implement the recommendation that the two schools be merged into a single entity, with the preferred location to be at the Dickinson campus. 

U.S. News & World Report, in its 2021 rankings of Best Graduate Schools, ranked Penn State Law 60th among 194 law schools fully accredited by the American Bar Association.

Lewis Katz Building

Penn State Law is housed in the Lewis Katz Building on Penn State's University Park campus. The building opened for classes on January 9, 2009. The $60 million, 114,000-square foot building is the first academic facility to be built on the west side of Park Avenue on the University Park campus. The building is adjacent to the Penn State Arboretum.

The Lewis Katz Building is LEED certified and equipped with advanced high-definition digital audiovisual telecommunications capacity that enables real-time collaborative projects and programs with schools and institutions worldwide. The second floor includes the glass-enclosed library, with a two-story information commons, four group study rooms, and 11 offices. Library spaces comprise about 50 percent of the building.

In 2009, Judge D. Brooks Smith used the Lewis Katz Building's courtroom to hear an oral argument to the Third Circuit Court of Appeals. In addition to the courtroom, the Katz Building includes a 250-seat auditorium, four 75-person classrooms, several seminar rooms, and a "boardroom" facilitating electronic "face-to-face" contact with meeting participants worldwide.

The Lewis Katz Building is a shared academic space that is used by both the law school and the Graduate School of International Affairs.  As such, many professors teach in both capacities.

Curriculum
The J.D. program at Penn State Law is a three-year, six-semester course of study. In the first year, required courses include Civil Procedure, Constitutional Law, Contracts, Criminal Law, Criminal Procedure, Property,  and Torts.  In the second or third year, two courses are required: Professional Responsibility and a seminar. Students must also complete required experiential learning credits.

Institutes, Centers and Programs

Center for Agricultural and Shale Law
Under the direction of Associate Dean Ross Pifer, the Center for Agricultural and Shale Law provides agricultural and shale law research and information with a specific focus on those issues of importance in Pennsylvania.  Through its programs, the Center serves a wide variety of stakeholders including agricultural producers, landowners and royalty owners, business professionals, judges, attorneys, legislators, government officials, community groups, and the general public.

Center for the Study of Mergers & Acquisitions
Headed by Professor Samuel C. Thompson, Jr., former director of the UCLA Center for the Study of Mergers and Acquisitions, the center examines corporate, securities, tax, antitrust, and other legal and economic issues that arise in mergers and acquisitions. An important part of the center's mission is to sponsor continuing legal education programs addressing these issues.

Penn State Law and the New York City Bar co-sponsor the Institute on Corporate, Securities, and Related Aspects of Mergers and Acquisitions.  The institute, which has been co-chaired by Professor Thompson and H. Rodgin Cohen of Sullivan & Cromwell LLP for a number of years, is held at the Bar's facility in New York City. Sessions provide analyses of recent developments in this area.

Institute for Arbitration Law and Practice
Directed by Professor Thomas E. Carbonneau, The Penn State Institute of Arbitration Law and Practice promotes and encourages the development of arbitration law and practice.

Institute for Sports Law, Policy & Research
Directed by Professor Stephen Ross, the Penn State Institute for Sports Law Policy & Research is designed to:

 promote dialogue between students of sport and major industry participants
 aid scholars in policy-oriented research
 facilitate the dissemination of this research to policymakers and industry participants, and
 serve as a resource for journalists, lawyers, and others about sports and public policy

The institute is aided by an advisory board of industry leaders, sports scholars, and Penn State faculty and alumni, all dedicated to advancing the study of sports. The institute works closely with the John Curley Center for Sports and Journalism, the Center for Sports Business & Research in the Smeal College of Business, and the Departments of Kinesiology and Statistics.

Policy Innovation Lab of Tomorrow (PILOT lab) 
Founded and directed by Professor Andrea M. Matwyshyn, PILOT lab is a research initiative that is part of the Penn State Law, Policy, & Engineering program – an interdisciplinary venture across Penn Law, Penn State College of Engineering, and Penn State School of International Affairs.

Other Penn State Law programs

 Arts, Sports, and Entertainment Law Clinic
 Center for Immigrants' Rights Clinic
 Civil Rights Appellate Clinic
 Entrepreneur Assistance Clinic
 Family Law Clinic
 Indigent Criminal Justice Practicum
 International Sustainable Development Projects Clinic
 Rural Economic Development Clinic
 Veteran and Servicemembers Legal Clinic
 International Justice Externship at the Hague, Netherlands
 Washington, D.C. Semester Program
 Explore Law Program (for undergraduate students)
 Study Abroad

Law journals
Penn State law also features three scholarly journals, including the Penn State Law Review. In addition, the school also publishes:

 Penn State Journal of Law and International Affairs
 Arbitration Law Review (formerly The Yearbook on Arbitration and Mediation)

Student organizations
Penn State Law has the following student organizations:

ABA/Law Student Division—PBA/Young Lawyers Division
Advocacy and Litigation Society
Agricultural Law Society
Alternative Dispute Resolution Society
Alternative Spring Break Initiative
Alumni Relations Committee
American Association for Justice
American Constitution Society for Law and Policy (ACS)
Arts & Culture Legal Society
Asian Pacific American Law Students Association (APALSA)
Black Law Students Association
Corpus Juris Society
Criminal Law Society
Environmental Law Society
Family Law Society
Fashion and Business Law Society
Federalist Society
International Law Society
J. Reuben Clark Law Society
Jewish Legal Society
John Reed Inn of Phi Delta Phi
Latinx Law Students Association
Law and Education Alliance at Penn State
Military Law Caucus
Minority Law Students Association
Muslim Legal Society
National Lawyers Guild
OutLaw-LGTB Legal Organization
Attending Law School (PALS)
The Penn State Law Blue and White Society
Penn State International Arbitration Group (PSIAG)
Penn State Law Benefiting THON
Phi Alpha Delta
Project S.T.A.F.F.
Public Interest Law Fund
Res Ipsa Loquitur
Speakers Trust Fund
Sports and Entertainment Law Society
Student Animal Legal Defense Fund
Student Bar Association
Student Health Law Association
Trial Advocacy Board
Volunteer Income Tax Assistance Program
Women's Law Caucus
WorkLaw Society

The school also participates in a number of moot court competitions including the Willem C. Vis Moot Commercial Arbitration Moot Court, held each year in Vienna, Austria and the National Environmental Law Moot Court held at Pace University in White Plains, New York.

Students at Penn State Law also participate in intramural sports programs. Current intramural sports teams include basketball, bowling, flag football, floor hockey, indoor soccer, and volleyball. Several students are also members of rugby and softball teams. Each spring, the school sends a softball team to participate in the University of Virginia Law School softball tournament.

Student Awards 

The Woolsack Honor Society was founded in 1920 for the purpose of recognizing academic excellence. It was reestablished in 1981. Membership in the Society is extended to: 1) Students who rank in the top fifteen percent of the graduating class after 5 semesters; and 2) Students who do not qualify for membership after 5 semesters but who rank in the top 15 percent of the graduating class after six semesters.

Academic Honors are awarded as follows: cum laude to graduates who rank in the top 30 percent of the graduating class, magna cum laude to those who rank in the top 15 percent, and summa cum laude to those who rank in the top 5 percent of their class.

Employment 
According to Penn State's official 2019 ABA-required disclosures, 80.4% of the class of 2019 from Penn State Law obtained full-time, long-term, J.D. required or J.D.-Advantage employment 10 months after graduation.

Costs
The total cost of attendance (including tuition and related expenses) at Penn State Law for the 2018-2019 academic year is $73,964.

References

External links
 

Penn State Law
Law schools in Pennsylvania
Universities and colleges in Centre County, Pennsylvania
State College, Pennsylvania
1834 establishments in Pennsylvania